This is a list of Swedish poets, including those who are Swedish by nationality or who write in the Swedish language (years link to the corresponding "[year] in poetry" article):



A
 Arvid August Afzelius (1785–1871), pastor, poet, historian and mythologist
 Sofia Ahlbom
 Catharina Ahlgren (1734 – c. 1800), feminist writer, poet, translator, editor, and one of the first identifiable female journalists in Sweden
 Per Ahlmark (born 1939), writer and former leader of the Liberal People's Party
 Kurt Almqvist (1912–2001), poet, academic and spiritual figure
 August Bernhard Andersson (1877–1961)
 Dan Andersson (1888–1920)
 Werner Aspenström (1918–1997)
 Sun Axelsson (1935–2011), poet, novelist, translator and journalist
Back to top

B
 Albert Ulrik Bååth (1853–1912)
 Frans G. Bengtsson (1894–1954)
 Bengt Berg (1885–1967)
 Bo Bergman (1869–1967)
 Marcus Birro (born 1972)
 Erik Blomberg (1894–1965)
 Carl Boberg (1859–1940)
 Karin Boye (1900–1941)
 Sophia Elisabet Brenner (1659–1730)
Back to top

C
 Siv Cedering (1939–2007)
 Christina Charlotta Cederström
 Samuel Columbus (1642–1679)
 Gustaf Filip Creutz (1731–1785)
Back to top

D
 Gunno Eurelius Dahlstierna (1661–1709)
 Olof von Dalin (1708–1763)
 Ebba Maria De la Gardie  (1657–1697)
Back to top

E
 Johannes Edfelt (1904–1997)
 Vilhelm Ekelund (1880–1949)
 Gunnar Ekelöf (1907–1968)
Back to top

F
 Öyvind Fahlström
 Nils Ferlin (1898–1961)
 Lars Forssell (1928–2007)
 Jacob Frese (1691–1729)
 Katarina Frostenson (born 1953)
 Gustaf Fröding (1860–1911)
Back to top

G
 Karl Johan Gabrielsson
 Erik Gustaf Geijer
 Kay Glans (born 1955)
 Lars Gustafsson
Back to top

H
 Britt G. Hallqvist (1914–1997)
 Gunnar D. Hansson
 Verner von Heidenstam (1859–1940)
 Gunnar Henningsson (1895–1960)
 Urban Hiarne (1641–1724)
 Rose-Marie Huuva (born 1943)
Back to top

J
 Ann Jäderlund (1955–1955)
 Lars Johansson (1638–1674)
 Majken Johansson
 Gabriel Jönsson
Back to top

K
 Erik Axel Karlfeldt (1864–1931)
 Greta Knutson
Back to top

L
 Olof Lagercrantz
 Pär Lagerkvist (1891–1974)
 Stig Larsson
 Oscar Levertin (1862–1906)
 Sven Lidman
 Erik Lindegren
 Ebba Lindqvist
 Kristina Lugn
 Artur Lundkvist (1906–1991)
Back to top

M
 Bertil Malmberg (1889–1958)
 Tom Malmquist
 Harry Martinson (1904–1978)
Back to top

N
 Ture Nerman
 Lars Norén
Back to top

O
 Charlotta Öberg (1818–1856)
 Bruno K. Öijer (born 1951)
 Mohamed Omar (born 1976)
 Mathilda Valeria Beatrix d'Orozco
Back to top

R
 Johan Runius (1679–1713)
Back to top

S
 Östen Sjöstrand (1925–2006), poet, writer and translator
 Georg Stiernhielm (1598–1672)
 Eva Ström (born 1947)
 Jesper Svenbro (born 1944), poet and classical philologist
 Hjalmar Söderberg (1869–1941)
Back to top

T
 Tomas Tranströmer (1931–2015), writer, poet and translator
 Samuel Triewald (1688–1743)
Back to top

V
 Karl Vennberg
Back to top

W
 Gunnar Wennerberg
 Jacques Werup
 Lars Wivallius (1605–1669)
 Beppe Wolgers

See also

 Swedish literature

Notes

Swedish
Swedish
Poets